Dera Ismail Khan (Urdu and), abbreviated as D.I. Khan, is a city and capital of Dera Ismail Khan District, located in Khyber Pakhtunkhwa, Pakistan. It is the 37th largest city of Pakistan and fifth largest in the province of Khyber Pakhtunkhwa by population. Dera Ismail Khan is situated on the west bank of the Indus River, at its junction with the Gomal River.

Etymology
In the local language, the word ḍerā means "tent, encampment", and is commonly found in the name of towns in the Indus Valley such as Dera Ghazi Khan and Dera Bugti. It is named after Baloch mercenary Ismail Khan, son of Malik Sohrab Dodai, who founded the town. "Dera Ismail Khan" thus means "Camp Ismail Khan."

People of Dera Ismail Khan as well as Dera Ghazi Khan are known by the demonym Dērawāl.
The majority of the population are Saraiki people.

History

Foundation

Early history

The region around Dera Ismail Khan has been inhabited for millennia, as evidenced by the nearby site of Rehman Dheri — a pre-Harappan archaeological site dating from 3300 BCE. In the seventh century, the city had a large population of Brahmins and Buddhists.

Medieval history
D. I. Khan is located in the historical Derajat region, which was established in the 15th century, when Baloch people were invited to settle the region by Shah Husayn, of the Langah Sultanate of Multan.

Shah Husayn being unable to hold his trans-Indus possessions, assigned the region around D. I. Khan to Sardar Malik Sohrab Khan Dodai Baloch in 1469 or 1471 and appointed him as "Jagir". Malik originally hailed from the Makran District of southwestern Balochistan province. His success lead to the migration of other Makrani tribesmen — one of which, Ghazi Khan, founded the city of Dera Ghazi Khan further south. Malik's son, Ismail Khan, is traditionally believed to have founded the city of Dera Ismail Khan, though the Emperor Babur passed through the region in 1506 and made no mention of the city.

Baloch settlers were assimilated through the, later waves of Pashtun settlement, although villagers along the alluvial plains are typically Baloch or Jat. 

Dera Ismail Khan region was part of Multan province of Mughal Empire. The city was along the major Multan-to-Kandahar trade route, though D. I Khan never attained a station of great power or importance before the British period. D. I. Khan grew prosperous as a trading centre for Powindah nomads. During Nader Shah's invasion of the Mughal Empire.

D. I. Khan was ruled by nine generations of Baloch leaders descended directly from Ismail Khan. The last, Nusrat Khan, was removed from power after the city was captured by Ahmad Shah Durrani in 1750. In 1794, the city was granted to Nawab Muhammad Khan Sadozai by Shahzada Kamran Durrani.

Reestablishment of the city
The original town was swept away by flooding on the Indus River in 1823. The present city was founded by Nawab Sher Muhammad Khan of the Sadduzai clan in 1825, and now stands four miles (6  km) away from the permanent channel of the river, atop a small plateau. Nawab Sadozai took into consideration the opinions of Diwan Lakhi Mal and Tej Bhan Nandwani for the city's reconstruction. Architects were brought in from Punjab, who designed a city where Hindus would live south of the city center and Muslims north of it. Four bazaars were laid in each of the cardinal directions, with all four converging in the town's central Chowgalla. The rebuilt city contained a large bazaar for Afghan traders, and the city prospered from trade via the Gomal Pass. An eight-foot mud wall with nine gates was built around the city during this time as well, some of which such as the Kaneran Wala and Sakki survive until today. All existing buildings date from no earlier than the 19th century.

Sikh rule(1821-1849)
D. I. Khan remained under Sadozai rule from the nearby town of Mankera until it was annexed by Bhatti Jatsikh ruler Maharaja Nau Nihal Singh of the Sikh Empire in 1836. Diwan Lakhi Mal appointed the city's Kardar ruler, though the Nawabs of the city from the Durrani order were allowed to maintain their title and some income. The city suffered under punitive taxes that lead to frequent complaints in the Sikh Darbar at Lahore, resulting in several changes of Kardar. The city was annexed by the British in 1849 following their conquest of Punjab that resulted in the defeat of the Sikhs as the Battle of Gujrat.

Colonial British India era 
NWFP province was made out of Punjab province in 1920. D. I. Khan was made part of the NWFP, now known as KPK province.

D. I. Khan's first deputy commissioner under British Indian Empire was General Henry Charles Van Cortland, who arrived in February 1848, before departing later that year to quell a revolt in nearby Multan. Following the defeat of rebels at Multan, Lieutenant Butler was made the next deputy commissioner of D. I. Khan and Bannu. Under his rule, the city's infrastructure and colonial administration system were established in which top posts were exclusively occupied by the British. The city was on the edge of the Tribal Areas — lands that were frequently in rebellion against British Indian Empire. The town did not rise up in revolt against British Indian Empire during the 1857 Sepoy Mutiny. In 1861, D. I. Khan was made into the Divisional Capital of the new Dera Ismail Khan Division: analogous to a British county.

The municipality was constituted in 1867, while the Dera Ismail Khan Cantonment was established in 1894. By 1881 the city's population was 22,164. The Derajat Brigade had its winter headquarters at Dera Ismail Khan, and the garrison consisted of a mountain battery, a regiment of Native cavalry, and three regiments of Native infantry. Detachments from these regiments helped to garrison the outposts of Drazinda, Jandola, and Jatta. The "Civil Lines" neighborhood was built to the south.

The local trade of Dera Ismail Khan was of moderate importance, but some foreign traffic with Central Asia passed through it. Powindah caravans of Afghan merchants traversed the town twice a year on their road to and from India. With the increasing security of the Gomal route, these caravans were swelling in numbers. The chief imports were English and native piece-goods, hides, salt, and fancy wares; the exports were grain, wood, and ghee. The local manufacturers specialized in lungis and lacquered woodwork.

The town possessed a civil hospital; its chief educational institutions were two aided Anglo-vernacular high schools, one maintained by the Church Missionary Society and the other by the Bharatri Sabha, and an Anglo-vernacular middle school maintained by the municipality.

According to the 1901 census, the population of Dera Ismail Khan was 31,737, of whom 18,662 were Muslims, 11,486 Hindus, and 1,420 Sikhs. Of the total, 3,450 lived in the cantonment. In 1911 the population reached 35,131 and in 1921 it became 39,341.

In 1932, the population of Dera Ismail Khan was 56,741. It consisted of Hindus and Muslims, the latter of which included recent converts from Hinduism and Pashtuns.

The predominantly Muslim population supported the Muslim League and the Pakistan Movement. After the Partition of India and independence of Pakistan in 1947, the minority Hindus and Sikhs migrated to India, while the Muslim migrants from India settled in Dera Ismail Khan. In India, Model Town, Vijay Nagar and Derawal Nagar colony in Delhi absorbed many Hindu former residents of D. I. Khan.

Modern era 
Following an influx of refugees following the 1979 Soviet invasion of Afghanistan, D. I. Khan's population tripled.

D. I. Khan was badly affected by a terrorist campaign conducted throughout northwest Pakistan, primarily between 2007 and 2014 by the Tehreek-e-Taliban Pakistan. A suicide bomber on January 29, 2007 detonated himself killing two while injuring seven people. During the 2008 Dera Ismail Khan suicide bombing a bomber targeting some specific Shias blew himself up in a hospital waiting room, killing 32 people. The attacks were carried out by the Tehreek-e-Taliban Pakistan to pressure the government to call off its offensive in Swat and the Bajaur Agency of the Federally Administered Tribal Areas, which had begun less than two weeks earlier. During the November 2008 Dera Ismail Khan bombing, Shia religious leader Allama Nazir Hussain Shah was shot dead in a sectarian killing with Shah Iqbal Hussain. During his funeral prayers, a suicide bomber blew himself up, killing nine people and injuring 39. In the January 2009 bombings, 52 people were injured while 16 were killed as three explosions took place in the city. In May 2009, three explosions caused the deaths of five people while nine were injured. On 14 June 2009, eight people were killed while 27 injured in an explosion in Pir Market near a bus stand. On 29 July 2009, two people were killed and four injured when a bomb planted in car detonated near the district court. On May 18, 2010, a bomb planted on a motorcycle exploded near a police van killing 13 people while injuring 14. On 25 June 2011, between 10 and 12 militants of Tehreek-i-Taliban Pakistan attacked a police station in the nearby town of Kulachi, killing 10 police officers. The Tehrik-e-Taliban Pakistan claimed the responsibility of these attacks.

In 2014, the wide-scale Operation Zarb-e-Azb was launched against militants throughout Pakistan, which resulted in a greatly improved security environment by 2016, although on January 4, 2017 15 people including five policemen were killed when a remote control planted bomb exploded on Bannu Road. On 17 February 2017, another five people, including four police officers, were killed after unidentified suspects opened fire on a police van near Mission Mor.

As part of the 2015 China-Pakistan Economic Corridor, it was announced that D. I. Khan would be the terminus of the Hakla–Dera Ismail Khan Motorway — a four-lane controlled access motorway, 280 km in length, that is to begin at the M1 near Islamabad and serve as part of the Western Alignment of the economic corridor.

Geography

Climate
Dera Ismail Khan has a hot desert climate (Köppen BWh) with sweltering summers and warm winters. Rain mainly falls in two distinct periods: in the late winter and early spring from February to April, and in the monsoon in July and August.

Transportation

Road
.

The city is connected to Bannu via the highway, which further connects it to the provincial capital of Peshawar via Kohat and Darra Adam Khel. Another road connects D. I. Khan to Mianwali through Chashma Barrage, and another connects the city to Zhob. The third major road connects it to Bhakkar in Punjab, situated on the eastern bank of the Indus River. A bridge on the Indus River was constructed in the early 1980s, before which the approach to Bhakkar was made through a boat bridge. Another road connect it to district Tank which further leads towards Jandola-AngoorAdda areas of South South Waziristan district at North west and Pezu on eastern side.

D. I. Khan is at the terminus of the Hakla–Dera Ismail Khan Motorway — a 280-km, four-lane controlled access motorway that is to extend from the Hakla Interchange on the M1 Motorway, near Islamabad to D. I. Khan.

Air
The city is served by Dera Ismail Khan Airport, though no commercial flights operate to the airport.

See also 
 Balochistan
 Derajat
 Dera Ismail Khan District
 Dera Ismail Khan Airport
 Kafir Kot

References

External links 
 

Dera Ismail Khan
Populated places established in the 15th century
!
Cities in Khyber Pakhtunkhwa